Twin Creek is a stream in the U.S. state of Ohio. Lesley Run is a tributary of Twin Creek.

Twin Creek was so named by the Potawatomi Indians on account of its branches.

A USGS stream gauge on the creek near Germantown recorded a mean annual discharge of  during water years 1921-2019.

See also
List of rivers of Ohio

References

Rivers of Darke County, Ohio
Rivers of Montgomery County, Ohio
Rivers of Preble County, Ohio
Rivers of Warren County, Ohio
Rivers of Ohio
Tributaries of the Ohio River